1B may refer to:

Science and technology 
 Alpha-1B adrenergic receptor
 Arginine vasopressin receptor 1B
 Interferon beta-1b
 Melatonin receptor 1B
 The ASCII hexadecimal code for the escape character

Sport 
 First baseman
 Single (baseball)

Transport 
 Axle arrangement on steam locomotives corresponding to a 2-4-0 wheel arrangement
 GCR Class 1B, a class of British 2-6-4T steam locomotive
 National Highway 1B (India, old numbering)

See also
 B1 (disambiguation)
 Billion